Cryptophasa vacuefacta is a moth in the family Xyloryctidae. It was described by Edward Meyrick in 1925. It is found on New Guinea.

The wingspan is about 46 mm. The forewings are a light brown-yellow color, and the hindwings are white.

References

Cryptophasa
Moths described in 1925
Taxa named by Edward Meyrick